The 1997 KNVB Cup Final was a football match between Roda JC and Heerenveen on 8 May 1997 at De Kuip, Rotterdam. It was the final match of the 1996–97 KNVB Cup competition and the 79th KNVB Cup final. Roda won 4–2 after goals from Gerald Sibon, Ger Senden, Eric van der Luer and Maarten Schops. It was the side's first KNVB Cup trophy.

Route to the final

Match

Details

References

External links
 

1997
1996–97 in Dutch football
Roda JC Kerkrade matches
SC Heerenveen matches
May 1997 sports events in Europe